William was an Italo-Norman nobleman, the son and successor of Count Robert II of Loritello in 1137. 

He reigned only briefly, because, immediately after his succession, the Emperor Lothair II descended the peninsula to fight the royal pretensions of Roger II of Sicily in the Mezzogiorno. On the river Tronto, William did homage to Lothair and opened the gates of Termoli to him. In this he joined Count Hugh II of Molise. 

William did not last long in this state. As the first to openly welcome the emperor to the south, the royal furor landed on him with especial swiftness. His county was seized by the crown. It was not regranted until Roger's death, when William I of Sicily granted it to Robert II, Count of Conversano.

Sources
Molise in the Norman period.

Italo-Normans
Norman warriors
Counts of Loritello
12th-century Italian nobility